Marilyn Jones is the name of:

 Marilyn C. Jones (1927–2015), American baseball player
 Marilyn Jones (dancer) (born 1940), Australian dancer
 Marilyn Mercer Jones (1917–2002), or Mars Jones, American female fishermen and boat captain